Halutz or chalutz is an early Jewish immigrant to Palestine. It may refer to:

 Dan Halutz (born 1948), Israeli military commander
 Har Halutz (Mount Halutz), or simply Halutz, a community settlement in Galilee, Israel

See also
 HeHalutz, "The Pioneer", a Zionist Jewish youth movement